David Russell Williams (born March 7, 1963) is a convicted British-born Canadian felon and former Air Force officer. He is currently serving a life without the possibility of parole for 25 years for two murders, committed in November 2009 and January 2010.

In late January 2010, the Ontario Provincial Police (OPP) discovered evidence that led them to suspect Williams' involvement in the disappearance and death of Jessica Lloyd, and suspected links to two other crimes that had been committed in close proximity to other locations near Williams' previous home in Tweed, Ontario. On February 7, Williams was interrogated on video by OPP investigator Jim Smyth and confronted with the evidence of tire tracks and boot prints at Lloyd's home. Over the next 10 hours, Williams gave a detailed confession of the sexual assault and murder of Lloyd, and also the sexual assault and murder of Corporal Marie-France Comeau and at least two other cases initially. 

The subsequent investigation into Williams brought further confessions and revealed evidence of detailed notes and photographs stored at his home. The evidence showed he had broken into at least 82 houses to steal women's and girls' underwear. This behaviour later escalated to sexual assaults and later still to the rapes and murders. He was charged with two counts of first-degree murder, two counts of forcible confinement, two counts of breaking and entering, and sexual assault. Another 82 charges relating to breaking and entering were later added.

On October 21, 2010, Williams was sentenced to two life sentences for first-degree murder, two 10-year sentences for other sexual assaults, two 10-year sentences for forcible confinement, and 82 one-year sentences for breaking and entering, all to be served concurrently. The life sentences mean Williams will serve a minimum of 25 years before parole eligibility. Because he was convicted of multiple murders, Williams is not eligible for early parole under the "faint hope clause" of the Criminal Code.

From July 2009 until his arrest in February 2010, Williams commanded CFB Trenton, Canada's largest military airbase and a hub for the country's foreign and domestic air transport operations. He was also a decorated military pilot who had flown Canadian Forces VIP aircraft for dignitaries and heads of state. Following charges being made on February 8, 2010, Williams was relieved as the base commander at CFB Trenton. Following his conviction, on October 22, 2010, Williams was stripped of his commission, ranks, and awards by the Governor General on the recommendation of the Chief of the Defence Staff. His uniform, documents and military equipment were destroyed by the Canadian military.

Early life and education 

David Russell Williams was born in Bromsgrove, Worcestershire, England, to Christine Nonie (née Chivers) and Cedric David Williams. His family immigrated to Canada, where they moved to Chalk River, Ontario. His father was hired as a metallurgist at Chalk River Laboratories, a Canadian nuclear research laboratory. After this relocation, the Williams family met another family, the Sovkas, and they became good friends. Williams' parents divorced when he was six years old, and soon after, Nonie Williams married Dr. Jerry Sovka. During this time, Williams took the name Sovka from his stepfather, and moved again to Scarborough, Ontario, a borough of Toronto. 

While in the Scarborough Bluffs area, Williams began high school at Birchmount Collegiate, but finished at Upper Canada College. He delivered The Globe and Mail newspaper and learned to play the piano. By 1979, his family moved to South Korea, where Sovka was overseeing another reactor project. Williams completed his final two years of high school as a boarding student at Upper Canada College while his parents were in South Korea. In his final year in 1982, he was selected as a prefect for his boarding house. Williams then studied economics and political science at the University of Toronto Scarborough (UTSC), graduating with a Bachelor of Arts in 1986. At UTSC, Williams engaged in pranks against his roommates, picking locked doors and hiding in rooms for hours to surprise the occupants.

Military service 

Williams was regarded as a model military officer over the course of his 23-year career. He joined the Canadian Forces in 1987, received his flying wings in 1990, and was posted to 3 Canadian Forces Flying Training School, based at CFB Portage la Prairie, Manitoba, where he served for two years as an instructor.

Promoted to captain on January 1, 1991, Williams was posted to 434 Combat Support Squadron at CFB Shearwater, Nova Scotia, in 1992, where he flew the CC-144 Challenger in the electronic warfare and coastal patrol role. In 1994, he was posted to the 412 Transport Squadron in Ottawa, where he transported VIPs, including high-ranking government officials and foreign dignitaries, also on Challengers. He was promoted to major in November 1999 and was posted to Director General Military Careers, in Ottawa, where he served as the multi-engine pilot career manager.

He earned a Master of Defence Studies from the Royal Military College of Canada in 2004 with a 55-page thesis that supported pre-emptive war in Iraq, and in June 2004, he was promoted to lieutenant-colonel and the following month, he was appointed commanding officer of 437 Transport Squadron at CFB Trenton, Ontario, a post he held for two years. From December 2005 to May 2006, Williams also served as the commanding officer of Camp Mirage, a secretive logistics facility believed to be located at Al Minhad Air Base in Dubai, United Arab Emirates that provides support to Canadian Forces operations in Afghanistan.

Williams was posted to the Directorate of Air Requirements on July 21, 2006, where he served as project director for the Airlift Capability Projects Strategic (C-17 Globemaster III) and Tactical (CC-130J Super Hercules), and Fixed-Wing Search and Rescue (CC-127J Spartan), working under Lieutenant General Angus Watt at this posting. In January 2009, he was posted to the Canadian Forces Language School in Gatineau, Quebec, for a six-month period of French language training, during which he was promoted to colonel by recommendation of the now-retired Watt.

On July 15, 2009, Williams was sworn in as the Wing Commander at CFB Trenton by the outgoing Wing Commander Brigadier General Michael Hood. CFB Trenton is Canada's busiest air transport base and locus of support for overseas military operations. Located in Trenton, Ontario, the base also functioned as the point of arrival for the bodies of all Canadian Forces personnel killed in Afghanistan, and the starting point for funeral processions along the "Highway of Heroes" whence their bodies were brought to Toronto for autopsy.

Williams had been described as an elite pilot and "shining bright star" of the military. He had flown Queen Elizabeth II and the Duke of Edinburgh, the Governor General of Canada, the Prime Minister of Canada, and many other dignitaries across Canada and overseas in Canadian Forces VIP aircraft.

Criminal proceedings

Investigation leading to arrest 

Twenty-seven-year-old Jessica Lloyd went missing on January 28, 2010. Investigators identified distinctive tire tracks left in the snow along the north tree line of her property, approximately 100 meters north of her home. One week after her disappearance, the Ontario Provincial Police (OPP) conducted an extensive canvassing of all motorists using the highway near her home from 7:00 p.m. on February 4, 2010, to 6:00 a.m. the next morning, looking for the tire treads. Williams was driving his Nissan Pathfinder that day—rather than the BMW he usually drove—and an officer noticed the resemblance of his tire treads. These were subsequently matched to the treads near Lloyd's home.

On February 7, 2010, Williams was at his newly built home in the Ottawa suburb of Westboro, where his wife lived full-time and he lived part-time, when he was called by the Ottawa Police Service and asked to come in for questioning.

Interview and confession 

On February 7, 2010, Williams was interrogated at the police headquarters by OPP Detective Staff Sergeant James Smyth. Williams was confronted with the evidence gathered so far starting at 3:00p.m. with the interrogation lasting approximately 10 hours overall. By 7:45p.m. Williams had begun confessing to his crimes. In the confession, Williams gave details of and admitted to dozens of crimes including the sexual assaults in Tweed. Most of the assaults in Ottawa occurred at homes within walking distance of his new home where he lived with his wife. Other break-ins and thefts occurred in Belleville, and in Tweed, where the couple had a cottage since 2004. He also told police where they could find evidence inside his Ottawa home, including hidden keepsakes, and photographs that he took of his victims and of himself modelling in their underwear. 

He then identified on a map where he dumped Lloyd's body. Early the next morning, Williams led investigators to the woman's body in a secluded area on Cary Road, 13 minutes away from where he lived.

Charges 

Along with the murder charges, Williams was charged with breaking and entering, forcible confinement, and the sexual assault of two other women in connection with two separate home invasions near Tweed, Ontario, in September 2009. According to reports, the women had been bound in their homes and Williams had taken photos of them. Williams was also charged in the death of Corporal Marie-France Comeau, a 37-year-old military traffic technician based at CFB Trenton, who had been found dead inside her home in late November 2009.

Williams was remanded into custody on Monday, February 8, 2010. The Canadian Forces announced that day that an interim commander would soon be appointed to replace him (Dave Cochrane took over 11 days later), and removed his biography from the Department of National Defence website the following day.

Hours after the announcement of Williams' arrest, police services across the country reopened unsolved homicide cases involving young women in areas where Williams had previously been stationed. According to news reports, police began looking at other unsolved cases based on a full statement that Williams gave to police.

A week after his arrest, investigators reported that, along with hidden keepsakes and other evidence they had found in his home, they had matched a print from one of the homicide scenes to his boot.

In addition to the four primary incidents, the investigation into Williams includes probes into 48 cases of theft of women's underwear dating back to 2006. In the searches of his Ottawa home, police discovered stolen lingerie that was neatly stored, catalogued, and concealed.

In April 2010, Williams was placed on suicide watch at Quinte Detention Centre in Napanee, Ontario after he tried to kill himself by wedging a stuffed cardboard toilet paper roll down his throat.

After his conviction he was stripped of the rank of colonel in the Royal Canadian Air Force as well as his military decorations of the South-West Asia Service Medal with Afghanistan clasp and the Canadian Forces Decoration (CD) with one clasp by order of the Governor General of Canada, David Johnston. He was allowed to keep his military pension equal to $60,000 CAD per year as his pension can only be removed through an act of parliament.

Court proceedings and trial 

Williams appeared before the Ontario Court of Justice in Belleville, Ontario, via video link from the Quinte Detention Centre on July 22, 2010, where his next court appearance was set for August 26. Again via video link, Williams waived his right to a preliminary inquiry and thus had his next appearance scheduled at the Ontario Superior Court of Justice for October 7, 2010. Williams' lawyer stated then that his client would plead guilty to all charges filed against him.

On October 18, 2010, Williams pleaded guilty to all charges. On the first day of Williams' trial and guilty plea, details emerged of other sexual assaults he committed, including that of a new mother who was woken with a blow to the head while she and her baby were asleep in her house.

The first day of trial revealed that Williams also had pedophiliac tendencies, stealing underwear of girls as young as nine years old. He made 82 fetish-related home invasions and attempted break-ins between September 2007 and November 2009.

Williams had progressed from break-ins, to sexual assaults with no penetration, to finally rape and murder. He had kept detailed track of police reports of the crimes he was committing, logged his crimes, kept photos and videos, and had even left notes and messages for his victims. In a break-in into the bedroom of a 12-year-old girl, he left a message on her computer saying: "Merci" ("Thank you" in French). He had taken thousands of pictures of his crimes, and had kept the photos on his computer. Crown Attorney Robert Morrison presented numerous pictures of Williams dressed in the various pieces of underwear and bras he had stolen, frequently masturbating while lying on the beds of his victims.

Some of the photos presented on the first day of his trial were published in several newspapers. As some newspapers explained, although troubling, the photos were published because they capture the essence of the crimes of Williams and show the true nature of his crimes. Among the news media that published some of the released photographs were The Montreal Gazette and The Toronto Star.

Ontario Superior Court Justice Robert F. Scott sentenced Williams on October 22, 2010, to two concurrent terms of life imprisonment, with no consideration of parole for 25 years.

The Governor General of Canada, David Johnston, revoked Williams' commission and, later, medals, and he was expelled from the Canadian Forces for service misconduct, the most serious extant charge. After being returned to the Forces, his uniform was burned, his medals were cut into pieces, and his commission scroll (the instrument of his commission) was shredded; these actions being similar to a military degradation. His vehicle, a Nissan Pathfinder, was similarly crushed and scrapped.

Williams was initially incarcerated at Kingston Penitentiary, in the prison's segregation unit. After the prison began the process of closing, he was moved to the Port-Cartier Institution, a maximum-security prison in Port-Cartier, Quebec.

On May 10, 2012, the Canadian Forces announced that it had made a "terrible mistake" by publishing a booklet with a photograph bearing the likeness of Williams in the background, and ordered 4,000 copies of the book destroyed. The photograph was incidental to the subject matter of the book, but the image was felt to be offensive.

Personal life 

On June 1, 1991, Williams married Mary Elizabeth Harriman, who is an associate director of the Heart and Stroke Foundation of Canada. According to Williams' biography that had been posted on the Department of National Defence website, he was a keen photographer, fisherman and runner, and he and his wife were avid golfers. 

The couple moved to Orleans, a suburb of Ottawa, in July 2006. By then, Williams had been posted to the Directorate of Air Requirements at the National Defence Headquarters. He served at the Airlift Capability Projects Strategic (CC-177 Globemaster III) and Tactical (CC-130J Hercules J), and Fixed-Wing Search and Rescue.

In December 2010, Williams' wife began the process of filing for divorce, together with a request to have any of her financial and medical information sealed by the court. The divorce was not finalized until years later and Harriman's request was denied in 2014.

Media portrayals

Television
The Canadian investigative news program The Fifth Estate released an episode titled "Russell Williams: Above Suspicion" on September 24, 2010. The American investigative news programs 48 Hours aired "Name, Rank and Serial Killer?" on April 9, 2011; and Dateline NBC aired a piece covering the Williams case, titled "Conduct Unbecoming," on August 13, 2015. Season 4 of the documentary television series I Survived... (originally aired on September 30, 2012) featured one of Williams' victims recounting her story of Williams attacking her in her home. In November 2017, Dutch film director Ramón Gieling released a documentary, Fatum (Room 216), that uses footage of Williams' 10-hour-long police interrogation.

A television movie adaptation of the Williams case, An Officer and a Murderer, with American actor Gary Cole in the lead role, premiered on the Lifetime Network in the United States on July 21, 2012. A Canadian premiere on The Movie Network, originally planned for August 2012, was cancelled after "reviewing the media coverage" of the US premiere. An Officer and a Murderer eventually aired on Canadian television in August 2013.

Books
 

J. K. Rowling has stated that the serial killer in her novel Troubled Blood was, in part, based on Williams.

See also 

 List of serial killers by country
 Sexual assault in the Canadian Forces
Ronald Gray
Nidal Hasan

References 

|-

1963 births
21st-century Canadian criminals
Canadian male criminals
Canadian people convicted of murder
Canadian prisoners sentenced to life imprisonment
Canadian rapists
Canadian serial killers
English emigrants to Canada
Filmed killings
Living people
Male serial killers
Military personnel from Worcestershire
People convicted of murder by Canada
People from Bromsgrove
People from Scarborough, Toronto
People stripped of a British Commonwealth honour
Prisoners sentenced to life imprisonment by Canada
Royal Canadian Air Force officers
Royal Military College of Canada alumni
University of Toronto alumni
Upper Canada College alumni
Violence against women in Canada